The AAAS David and Betty Hamburg Award for Science Diplomacy (2022-) formerly the AAAS Award for Science Diplomacy (2010-2021) and Award for International Scientific Cooperation (1992-2009), is awarded by The American Association for the Advancement of Science (AAAS). After the 2021 presentation, the award was renamed in honor of psychiatrists David A. Hamburg and Beatrix Hamburg.

With this award, in collaboration with its affiliated organizations, AAAS seeks to recognize an individual or a limited number of individuals working together in the international scientific or engineering community for making an outstanding contribution to furthering international cooperation in science and engineering. The award offers a monetary prize of $2,500, a certificate of citation, and travel expenses to attend the AAAS annual meeting to receive the award.

Recipients

See also
 AAAS Award for Scientific Freedom and Responsibility
 AAAS Philip Hauge Abelson Prize
 AAAS Prize for Behavioral Science Research
 Newcomb Cleveland Prize

References

American science and technology awards
Humanitarian and service awards
Awards established in 1992
Award for Science Diplomacy